The bilateral relations between the People's Republic of China (PRC) and the Democratic People's Republic of Korea (DPRK) have been generally friendly, although they were sometimes strained in recent years because of North Korea's nuclear program. They have a close special relationship and China is often considered to be North Korea's closest ally. China and North Korea have a mutual aid and co-operation treaty, which is currently the only defense treaty either country has with any nation.

China maintains an embassy in the North Korean capital of Pyongyang and a consulate general in Chongjin. The embassy of North Korea in China is located in Beijing's Chaoyang District, while a consulate general is in Shenyang. North Korea has adhered to the One China principle, where it recognizes the PRC as the only representative of "China", and does not recognize the legitimacy of the Republic of China (ROC), nor Taiwanese independence.

China and North Korea have, in the past, enjoyed close diplomatic relations. However, China–North Korea relations have declined markedly over the past few years until 2018. Since 2018, ties between North Korea and China also appear to have improved and returned to normalcy, with North Korean leader Kim Jong-un making multiple trips to Beijing to meet Chinese Communist Party general secretary and president Xi Jinping. In the past, decline in China–North Korea relations was primarily due to growing concern in China over issues such as North Korea's impoundment of Chinese fishing boats and more importantly its nuclear weapons program. Relations have again been increasingly close since 2018, especially after Xi Jinping visited Pyongyang in June 2019.

Favorable views of North Korea among Chinese people appear to be receding. According to a 2014 BBC World Service Poll, 20% of Chinese people view North Korea's influence positively, with 46% expressing a negative view.

Country comparison 

Paramount leaders of China and Supreme leaders of North Korea since 1950

History

Early history and Korean War 

The Beiyang government of the Republic of China recognized the Korean Government-in-exile on April 13, 1919, during the period of Japanese colonial rule over Korea. After World War II, the northern half of Korea was placed under Soviet administration. The People's Republic of China and the Democratic People's Republic of Korea exchanged diplomatic recognition on 6 October 1949 with the PRC recognized the DPRK as the sole legitimate authority of Korea.

In May 1950, North Korea's Supreme Leader Kim Il-sung secretly visited Beijing to brief Chinese Communist Party chairman Mao Zedong and the Chinese leadership on his war plans. Historical analyses differ regarding whether Mao approved Kim's plans in advance. While Nikita Khrushchev wrote in his memoirs that Mao approved Kim's plans, viewing them is a matter the Korean people would decide for themselves, more recent research concludes that Mao did not approve Kim's plans in advance, and in fact was concerned that they would provoke a US-response and that China would be dragged into the conflict.

Following setbacks sustained by the Korean People's Army and the crossing of the 38th parallel by the United Nations Command led by the United States Armed Forces, in October 1950 Chinese forces secretly crossed into North Korea in response to security concern of a possible U.S. invasion of Chinese territory. The China–North Korea border assumed great strategic value for the Chinese Communist Party after the Empire of Japan invaded China through Korea twice in the First Sino-Japanese War and the Japanese invasion of Manchuria. It subsequently entered the Korean War in support of North Korea. China had cautioned that they would go as far as risking an all-war with the US-forces if they advanced towards the Yalu River. However, Douglas MacArthur defied US and UN orders and pushed towards the Yalu River, which enlarged the conflict when Chinese forces fought back and caught the UN forces by surprise, resulting them to retreat back to the 38th parallel, eventually turning into a stalemate and also the current boundary between North Korea and South Korea.

In addition to dispatching the Chinese People's Volunteers to Korea to fight against the United Nations Command, China also received North Korean refugees and students and provided economic aid during the war. Following the signing of the Korean War Armistice in 1953, China, along with members of the Eastern Bloc led by the Soviet Union, provided extensive economic assistance to Pyongyang to support the reconstruction and economic development of North Korea. After the war China continued to station 300,000 troops in North Korea for five years. National Defense Minister and commander of the Chinese forces in Korea Peng Dehuai urged Mao to remove Kim from power, but he was sidelined after he criticized the Great Leap Forward.

1956 August Faction Incident 
In 1956, at the 2nd Plenary Session of the 3rd Central Committee, leading pro-China Korean figures known as the Yan'an faction attempted to remove Kim Il-sung from power with the support of China and the Soviet Union, but failed. This incident has become known as the August Faction Incident and forms the historical basis for North Korean fears of Chinese interference. At the same time, China tried to maintain good relations with North Korea because of the Sino-Soviet split and de-Stalinization.

Deterioration in 1960s 
The 1960s have been characterized as a "contentious" period in China-North Korean relations. The Korean Workers' Party criticized the Cultural Revolution and described Mao Zedong as “an old fool who has gone out of his mind.” The People's Republic of China recalled its Ambassador from Pyongyang in October 1966, and the Red Guard criticized North Korea as being "revisionist" in the Dongfanghong newspaper. Tensions between Chinese Red Guards and North Korea led to some armed clashes in 1969. In 1970, Chinese premier Zhou Enlai traveled to Pyongyang to apologize for the treatment of North Korea by China. In the 1970s relations with North Korea improved, although Deng Xiaoping urged political and economic reforms after the Chinese economic reform and criticized the North Korean cult of personality and provocative actions such as the Rangoon bombing.

Sino-North Korean Mutual Aid and Cooperation Friendship Treaty 
In 1961, the two countries signed the Sino-North Korean Mutual Aid and Cooperation Friendship Treaty, whereby China pledged to immediately render military and other assistance by all means to its ally against any outside attack.

Post-Cold War era 
In 1992, DPRK-PRC relations worsened after China increased trade relations with North Korea's rival South Korea in the 1980s, culminating with the full normalization of diplomatic relations in 1992. China subsequently stopped selling goods to North Korea at discounted "friendship prices" and providing interest-free loans, leading to the decline of DPRK-PRC trade in the 1990s, although it began subsidizing trade to North Korea again in order to prevent a refugee crisis in Northeast China during the North Korean famine.

On 1 January 2009, Chinese paramount leader Hu Jintao and North Korean leader Kim Jong-il exchanged greetings and declared 2009 as the "year of China–DPRK friendship," marking 60 years of diplomatic relations between the two countries. In March 2010, Kim visited Beijing to meet with the Politburo Standing Committee of the Chinese Communist Party. 

In August 2012, Jang Song-thaek, uncle of Kim Jong-un, met Hu Jintao, General Secretary of the Chinese Communist Party in Beijing. It has since been widely reported that during their meeting, Jang told Hu Jintao he wished to replace Kim Jong-un with his brother Kim Jong-nam. The meeting was allegedly taped by Zhou Yongkang, then secretary of the Central Political and Legal Affairs Commission, who informed Kim Jong-un of the plot. In December 2013, Jang was executed for treason while in July 2014 Zhou was publicly put under investigation for corruption and other crimes and was arrested in December 2014. These events are said to have marked the beginning of Kim Jong-un's distrust of China, since they had failed to inform him of a plot against his rule, while China took a dislike to Kim for executing their trusted intermediary.

On 5 May 2013, North Korea "grabbed," according to Jiang Yaxian, a Chinese government official, another Chinese fishing boat in a series of impounding Chinese fishing boats. "North Korea was demanding 600,000 yuan ($97,600) for its safe return, along with its 16 crew." According to a December 2014 article in The New York Times, relations had reached a low point.

In March 2016 the North Korean leader Kim Jong-un visited a missile factory, which China strongly condemned, in a report by the state newspaper the People's Daily revealed that the North Korean politics causes instability on the Korean Peninsula and is comparable to the situation in Syria.

The involvement of the United States in the peninsula's affairs in April–May 2017 presented a major issue for China-American relations in organiser Li Xiaolin's preparations for Xi's visit to the US.

Nuclear weapons program 
Since 2003, China has been a participant in six-party talks aimed at resolving the issue of North Korea's nuclear weapons programme.

China condemned the 2006 North Korean nuclear test and approved United Nations Security Council Resolution 1718 expanding sanctions against North Korea. President Hu Jintao sent Foreign Minister Li Zhaoxing to Pyongyang to negotiate with Kim Jong-il to halt the nuclear program. According to U.S. National Security Council Director for Asian Affairs Victor Cha, Hu Jintao and the Chinese government were genuinely outraged by the test because North Korea had led it to believe that it did not have nuclear weapons and ignored its advice against building them. China was also concerned that the Liberal Democratic Party government of Japan would respond by expanding its military.

The Foreign Minister of the People's Republic of China Yang Jiechi said that China "resolutely" opposed the 2013 North Korean nuclear test conducted by North Korea. The North Korean ambassador to China, Ji Jae-ryong, was personally informed of this position on 12 February 2013 in a meeting with Yang Jiechi.

In 2016, right after the North Korean nuclear test in January tensions between China and North Korea have further grown, the reaction of China was, "We strongly urge the DPRK side to remain committed to its denuclearization commitment, and stop taking any actions that would make the situation worse," spokesperson Hua Chunying said. On 24 February 2016 the United States and China introduced new sanctions against the North Korean regime conducted within the United Nations context.

The  Times of India reported that the then British Foreign Secretary Boris Johnson saying at a dinner to mark India's independence that the Chinese control 90% of North Korea's trade and it is in the Chinese government's hands to exercise economic pressure on Kim Jong-un to achieve the diplomatic resolution needed to de-escalate tensions in the region.

The United States has sanctioned many Chinese companies for violating North Korean sanctions, possibly aiding their nuclear program.

2017 decline in relations 
Due to Chinese support for sanctions against North Korea, relations in 2017 took a negative turn with North Korean state media attacking China directly on at least three occasions. 

In February 2017, after China halted imports of coal from North Korea, the Korean Central News Agency (KCNA) said, "this country [China], styling itself a big power, is dancing to the tune of the US while defending its mean behaviour with such excuses that it was meant not to have a negative impact on the living of the people in the DPRK but to check its nuclear program".

In May 2017, KCNA made an unprecedented criticism of China, saying "a string of absurd and reckless remarks are now heard from China every day only to render the present bad situation tenser" and that "China had better ponder over the grave consequences to be entailed by its reckless act of chopping down the pillar of the DPRK-China relations". Accusing China of "big-power chauvinism", KCNA said Chinese support for sanctions against North Korea were "an undisguised threat to an honest-minded neighboring country which has a long history and tradition of friendship" and that "The DPRK will never beg for the maintenance of friendship with China".

In September 2017, KCNA slammed negative editorials by the People's Daily and Global Times, saying "some media of China are seriously hurting the line and social system of the DPRK and threatening the DPRK" and calling them "the dirty excrement of the reactionaries of history" who "spouted such extremely ill-boding words".

In February 2018, the KCNA again criticized Chinese media. According to KCNA, China Central Television "seriously spoiled the atmosphere of the feast by publishing presumptuous comments of individual experts" and the Global Times was condemned for "the behavior of scattering ashes on other's happy day as they bring the denuclearization issue".

Post-2018 improvement in relations 

In March 2018, North Korean leader Kim Jong-un met with Chinese leader Xi Jinping for the first time in Beijing. Xinhua News Agency reported that the North Korean leader's trip lasted four days. Kim and his wife Ri Sol-ju were met with honour guards and a lavish banquet hosted by Xi Jinping.

Xi was likewise received in the same-fashion when he visited Pyongyang in June 2019 on two-day state visit, the first of such since Hu Jintao's 2006 visit. In a North Korean mass games that Xi attended, he was depicted inside a gold-framed circle surrounded by red — the same style previously used to depict Kim Jong-un's father, Kim Jong-il, and grandfather, Kim Il-sung. It is also the first time a visit by a Chinese leader to North Korea has been called a "state visit" by the Chinese government.

In July 2019, North Korea was one of the 50 countries which signed a letter defending Xinjiang re-education camps and praising "China's remarkable achievements in the field of human rights in Xinjiang." North Korea has also defended China's position in the 2019–20 Hong Kong protests, with North Korean Foreign Minister Ri Yong-ho saying that "North Korea fully supports the stand and measures of China to defend the sovereignty, security and territorial integrity of the country and safeguard the prosperity and stability of Hong Kong, and concerns about foreign forces interference in Hong Kong issue." During an official visit to North Korea in September 2019, State Councilor Wang Yi said that "China will always stand on the road as comrades and friends" of North Korea.

In October 2019, the two countries celebrated the 70th anniversary of the establishment of relations, with KCNA saying that their "invincible friendship will be immortal on the road of accomplishing the cause of socialism".

In June 2020, North Korea was one of 53 countries that backed the Hong Kong national security law at the United Nations.

After the 20th CCP National Congress in 2022, Rodong Sinmun, official newspaper of the ruling Workers' Party of Korea, wrote a long editorial praising Xi, titling both Kim and Xi Suryong (수령), a title historically reserved for North Korea's founder Kim Il-sung.

Border 

China and North Korea share a 1,416 km long land border that corresponds almost entirely to the course of the Yalu and Tumen rivers.

The two countries signed a border treaty in 1962 to resolve their un-demarcated land border. China received 40% of the disputed crater lake on Paektu Mountain (known as Changbai Mountain in China), while North Korea held the remaining land.

In the 1950s and 1960s, many ethnic Koreans in Northeast China crossed the border into North Korea to escape economic hardship and famine in China. In recent years, the flow of refugees has reversed, with a considerable number of North Koreans fleeing to China. Much of China's trade with North Korea goes through the port of Dandong on the Yalu River.

In February 1997, tourist access to the bridge over the Tumen at Wonjong-Quanhe was allowed.

In May 2012, China and North Korea signed an agreement on the construction and management of the cross-border bridge between Manpo in the Jagang Province of North Korea and Jian in China.

In 2015, a single rogue North Korean soldier killed four ethnic Korean citizens of China who lived along the border of China with North Korea.

In April 2019, both countries opened the bridge connecting the cities of Ji'an, Jilin and Manpo after three years of construction.

Defectors 
Many North Korean defectors travel through their 880-mile-long border with China rather than through the de facto Demilitarized Zone (DMZ) to reach South Korea. In 1982, China joined both the UN Convention Relating to the Status of Refugees and the Protocols Relating to the Status of Refugees. The Chinese government does not have refugee-related laws relying instead on the Refugee Convention and Protocols to make decisions on refugee cases. China's membership in these two organizations requires them to provide personal rights (economic and social rights presented in the CSR and PRSR) to any refugee entering their borders. They are also a member of the UN Human Rights Council and accept many refugees held in countries such as Hong Kong, Macau, Vietnam, Japan, and Australia. Unlike refugees from these countries, China does not recognize North Korean defectors as refugees but rather classifies them as ‘economic refugees’ referring to their immigration due to food and financial struggles. Under the Refugee Conventions and Protocols, this would not classify North Korean defectors as refugees, but rather, border crossers, however, there is much debate over this. The Chinese government will, on rare occasions, allow North Korean Defectors to pass through China into a third country or, most commonly, force them to return to North Korea.

In 1986 China and North Korea intensified their monitoring of illegal border crossers, or North Korean defectors through the Mutual Cooperation Protocols for the National Security and Maintenance of Social Order in the Border Regions. This required China to detain North Korean defectors and provide the North Korean government with a list of any. Since then, China has classified North Korean defectors as illegal border crossers, or criminals, forcing them to return to North Korea. However, the issue here is that repatriating defectors as illegal border crossers defies the Forced Repatriation Prohibition Principle (part of international law according to South Korean legal experts).

Tensions regarding migrants crossing the Sino-North Korean border flared up in 2002 with a string of incidents of North Korean defectors reaching Spanish, Japanese, German, American, Canadian, and South Korean consulates in the Chinese city of Shenyang and embassies in the capital of Beijing. Incidents in which Chinese state forces physically dragged defectors who were seeking asylum from the front steps of Japanese and South Korean consulates received much international media attention and caused diplomatic rifts between involved countries. In one such case, a North Korean defector father and his 13-year-old son were separated as Chinese police pushed through a human wall of South Korean diplomats in an attempt to seize the migrants, ending in the father's capture and son's placement within the South Korean embassy in Beijing. In most cases of seizure, defectors are taken into custody by Chinese forces in order to be repatriated back to North Korea. Once in North Korea, most defectors are placed in penal camps which are known to be relatively liberal but still deadly.

Economic relations

China's economic assistance to North Korea accounts for about half of all Chinese foreign aid. Beijing provides the aid directly to Pyongyang, thereby enabling it to bypass the United Nations.

During the period of severe food shortage between 1996 and 1998, Beijing provided unconditional food aid to North Korea.

Trade 
China is North Korea's largest trade partner, while North Korea itself ranks relatively low as a source of imports to China. North Korea is dependent on trade and aid from China, although international sanctions against North Korea have decreased overall official volume of trade. Between 2000 and 2015, trade between the two countries grew over ten-fold, reaching a peak of $6.86 billion in 2014. China is a major investor in North Korea's mining and metallurgical industries including steel and iron, copper, coal, copper, and rare-earth minerals. PRC-DPRK trade also provides an important source of revenue to Jilin and Liaoning Provinces, which have suffered deindustrialization since the 1970s. In return, North Korea is dependent on China for imports of food and fuel, particularly since the end of South Korea's Sunshine Policy in 2008.

In February 2017, China restricted all coal imports from North Korea until 2018. In 2016, coal briquettes had been the single largest good exported by North Korea, accounting for 46% of its trade with China. China has said this was in line with the UN sanctions against North Korea, but it is speculated that this occurred because of a mix of events, including recent nuclear tests, the suspected assassination of Kim Jong-nam, brother of ruler Kim Jong-un, and pressure on China from the rest of the world and especially the United States. However, despite this, North Korea has been reported to evade sanctions and continue to sell coal to China through a loophole. On 28 September 2017, in response to new UN Security Council sanctions over a nuclear test earlier in the month, China ordered all North Korean companies operating in China to cease operations within 120 days.

By January 2018 customs statistics showed that trade between the two countries had fallen to a historic low, although volume again increased by 15.4% to $1.25 billion in the first half of 2019. China closed its border in late January 2020 due to the COVID-19 pandemic, and trade between the two countries nearly halted, with North Korean imports from and exports to China both down by over 90% year-over-year in March.

In 2020, trade fell by more than 80% due to COVID-19 pandemic. Chinese-North Korean trade was severely affected by the pandemic in 2020 onwards. Chinese-North Korean trade equaled US$318 million in 2021, compared to the US$539 million in 2020 and US$2.78 billion in 2019. Scholars have hinted that the prolonged COVID-19 restrictions from both North Korea and China have aided in the rapid decrease of trade revenue. Furthermore, there has been a lack of raw materials in North Korea, leading to less work, and thus less workers. This lack of raw materials can be attributed to China's lockdowns and restrictions during COVID-19. North Korea, due to their Enterprise Law in 2013 and 2015 allowed companies more freedom to control their own production, leading to an influx in Chinese raw materials and boosting bilateral trade.

North Korea had been one of the first countries to close their borders to China in order to avoid the virus, yet China is working to repair its ties with North Korea regardless. South Korea's central bank, the Bank of Korea, approximates that North Korea's economy shrank by around 4.5 percent. China and North Korea maintained informal trade, with China violating UN sanctions on North Korea. These sanctions include the illicit ship to ship transfers of 1.6 million barrels of refined oil to North Korea although the UN imposed a limit of 5,000 barrels per year. In September 2021, reports indicated that the Chinese government continued to smuggle imports of North Korean coal due to energy shortage issues throughout China. China has attempted to decrease the severity of sanctions against North Korean goods to address trade issues by appealing to the United Nations Security Council in November of the same year. In 2022, exports from China to North Korea increased by 247.5% year-on-year to $894 million, while total trade increased 226% from a year earlier to $1.03 billion.

Banking 
On 7 May 2013, Bank of China, China's biggest foreign exchange bank, joined other international banks in closing the accounts of North Korea's Foreign Trade Bank, its main foreign exchange bank. Although neither entity stated reasons for the closure, it is widely assumed that it was in response to sanctions placed against Bank of China by the United States for its alleged assistance in financing the North Korean nuclear weapons program.

Investments 
In 2012, a $45 million investment by China's Haicheng Xiyang Group into an iron-ore powder processing plant failed under what the Chinese called "a nightmare". On 21 February 2016 China quietly ended financial support of North Korea without any media publicity. It is reported to be due to the fallout of relations between the two governments.

In July 2019, Washington Post reported that Huawei "secretly helped" North Korea to build and maintain its commercial wireless network in conjunction with Chinese state-owned enterprise Panda International Information Technology Co.

Military relations 

China assisted North Korea during the Korean War (1950–53) against South Korean and UN forces on the Korean peninsula. Although China itself remained neutral, three million Chinese soldiers participated in the conflict as part of the People's Volunteer Army fighting alongside the Korean People's Army. As many as 180,000 were killed.

Since the end of the Korean War, the two states have closely cooperated in security and defense issues. The two countries signed the mutual aid and co-operation treaty in 1961, which is currently the only defense treaty either country has with any nation. In 1975, Kim Il-sung visited Beijing in a failed attempt to solicit support from China for a military invasion of South Korea. On 23 November 2009, Chinese Defense Minister Liang Guanglie visited Pyongyang, the first defense chief to visit since 2006.

In August 2019, director of the General Political Bureau of the KPA Kim Su Gil visited Beijing to meet with Zhang Youxia. Zhang told Kim that the delegation's visit as was of “crucial significance in bilateral exchange.“

Inter-visits by leaders 

In 1978, the DPRK celebrated the 30th anniversary of the republic, in which Deng Xiaoping attended in his official capacities as the First Vice Premier of the State Council and the Vice Chairman of the Chinese Communist Party.

See also 
 Korea Bay
 Sino-Korean Friendship Bridge
 List of ambassadors of China to North Korea
 Yalu River

References

Further reading 
 Gao, Bo. China's Economic Engagement in North Korea. . Singapore: Palgrave Macmillan, 2019.
 Jung, Heon Joo, and Timothy S. Rich. "Why invest in North Korea? Chinese foreign direct investment in North Korea and its implications." The Pacific Review 29.3 (2016): 307–330. online
 Kim, Jih-Un. "Inflated Hope, Unchanged Reality: China's Response to North Korea's Third Nuclear Test." Asian Perspective 39.1 (2015): 27–46. online
 Kim, Min-hyung. "Why provoke? The Sino-US competition in East Asia and North Korea's strategic choice." Journal of Strategic Studies 39.7 (2016): 979–998.
 Nanto, Dick K., and Mark E. Manyin. "China-North Korea Relations." North Korean Review (2011): 94–101. online
 Rozman, Gilbert. " North Korea's place in Sino-Russian relations and identities." in International Relations and Asia's Northern Tier (Palgrave, Singapore, 2018) pp. 301–314.
 Shin, Jong-Ho. "Evaluation of North Korea-China Summit and Its Implications on the Korean Peninsula." (2018). online
 Yin, Chengzhi (2022). "Logic of Choice: China's Binding Strategies toward North Korea, 1965–1970". Security Studies.

External links 
 Jayshree Bajoria and Beina Xu (2013), "The China-North Korea Relationship," Council on Foreign Relations.
 "China-North Korea Relations," Wilson Center Digital Archive.
 Dick K. Nanto and Mark E. Manyin (2010),"China-North Korea Relations," Congressional Research Service 
 Shen Zhihua (2008), "Alliance of 'Tooth and Lips' or Marriage of Convenience?," US-Korea Institute at SAIS WPS 08-09.
 DPRK–China Friendship Goes Down Century after Century at Naenara

 
Korea, North
Bilateral relations of North Korea
North Korea